The 14007 / 14008 Sadbhavna Express is an Express train belonging to Northern Railway Zone that runs between  and  via   in India. It is currently being operated with 14007/14008 train numbers on a bi-weekly basis.

Service

The 14007 Sadbhavna Express has an average speed of 42 km/hr and covers 1258 km in 29h 45m. The 14008 Sadbhavana Express has an average speed of 41 km/hr and covers 1258 km in 30h 30m.

Route and halts 

The important halts of the train are:

Coach composition

The train has standard LHB rakes with max speed of 110 kmph. The train consists of 20 coaches:

 2 AC III Tier
 9 Sleeper coaches
 7 General
 2 Seating cum Luggage Rake

Traction

Both trains are hauled by a Tuglakabad Loco Shed-based WDM-3A or WDP-4D diesel locomotive from Raxaul Junction to Anand Vihar Terminal and vice versa.

Direction reversal

The train reverses its direction once:

Rake sharing

The train shares its rake with 14015/14016/14017/14018 Sadbhavna Express (via Sagauli).

See also 

 Sadbhavna Express (via Sagauli)
 Sadbhavna Express (via Faizabad)

Notes

References

External links 

 14007/Sadbhavna Express (via Sitamarhi)
 14008/Sadbhavana Express (via Sitamarhi)

Transport in Raxaul
Transport in Delhi
Named passenger trains of India
Rail transport in Delhi
Rail transport in Bihar
Rail transport in Uttar Pradesh
Railway services introduced in 1994
Express trains in India